Paul Pfurtscheller (20 November 1855 Salzburg - 5 February 1927) was an Austrian zoologist and natural history artist who produced a series of 'Zoologischen Wandtafeln' (Zoological Wall Charts) from 1902 onwards. Such charts were initially used only in German-speaking countries, but their use soon became common elsewhere.

Pfurtscheller finished his schooling in 1874, and enrolled at the University of Vienna. In 1879 he was awarded a PhD degree and licensed to teach science. The next six years saw him teaching at the Franz-Josef Gymnasium, and then for three more years at a high school in Vienna. He then returned to the Franz-Josef Gymnasium, remaining there until his retirement in January 1911. From 1877 he was a member of the Zoological and Botanical Society.

Although he received no formal art training, he created the wall charts to illustrate his teaching lessons, and these were later used by the University Zoological Institute and highly regarded by eminent zoologists. He completed 38 plates and work on the 39th, which showed a dissection of the Oriental cockroach, was halted by his death, but was later completed.

The charts were originally published by 'A. Pichler's Witwe & Sohn und Buchhandlung Lehrmittelanstalt', a bookstore specialising in educational literature and teaching aids in Vienna and Leipzig. Sold individually, they were often varnished, resulting in a yellowish appearance with ageing. The first five charts went on sale in 1902, and some 70 in total were planned. The charts were last listed in a Martinus Nijhoff catalogue in 1953.

See also
 Hermann Zippel

External links
Gallery
Gallery
Gallery

References

Natural history illustrators
Austrian zoologists